Abdulaziz Al-Aazmi (born 6 February 1991) is a Saudi Arabian footballer who plays as a midfielder for Saudi Professional League team Al-Hilal F.C.

References

1991 births
Living people
Saudi Arabian footballers
Al Hilal SFC players
Al Nassr FC players
Najran SC players
Al-Najma SC players
Saudi Professional League players
Saudi Second Division players
Saudi Arabia youth international footballers
Association football midfielders